The women's pentathlon at the 2022 World Athletics Indoor Championships took place on 18 March 2022.

Results

60 metres hurdles
The 60 metres hurdles were started at 9:35.

High jump
The high jump was started at 11:02.

Shot put
The shot put was started at 13:20.

Long jump
The long jump was started at 17:30.

800 metres
The 800 metres was started at 19:50.

Final standings
After all events.

References

Pentathlon
Combined events at the World Athletics Indoor Championships